Unachess is a chess variant played with a standard board and pieces. It starts with each player having all his pieces in hand. The players start by putting their pieces on the board. Captures cannot be made by a side until its king has been placed on the board.

References

External links
http://play.chessvariants.org/erf/Unachess.html
http://www.chessvariants.org/diffsetup.dir/unachess.html Rules

Chess variants